Potamanthus longitibius is a species of hacklegilled burrower mayfly in the family Potamanthidae.

References

Further reading

 
 
 
 
 
 

Mayflies
Insects described in 1991